Gusevsky (masculine), Gusevskaya (feminine), or Gusevskoye (neuter) may refer to:
Gusevsky District, a district of Kaliningrad Oblast, Russia
Gusevsky Urban Okrug, a municipal formation which Gusevsky District of Kaliningrad Oblast, Russia is incorporated as
Gusevskoye Urban Settlement, several municipal urban settlements in Russia
Gusevsky (inhabited locality) (Gusevskaya, Gusevskoye), several inhabited localities in Russia